This is a list of episodes for Season 7 of Late Night with Conan O'Brien, which aired from September 7, 1999 to August 18, 2000.

Series overview

Season 7

References

Episodes (season 07)